Assad Wasfi Al-Hanini (Arabic: أسعد وصفي الحنيني) born 29 May 1994 is a Jordanian olympic boxer, mixed martial artist, musical artist and producer. who's a former fighter of DFC and Cage Warriors Championship.

Wasfi grew up in an Arab Muslim family in Jordan with a Boxing and Jiujitsu background.

Professional mixed martial arts career 
Desert Force Championship (2010–2014)

Debuting in August 2010, Assad Al Hanini fought at Desert Force Championship first event in his hometown Amman, Jordan.

In May 2011 at Desert Force 2 Assad won his second consecutive fight by way of TKO. Not too long after that he had his third bout in June at Cage Warriors FIGHT NIGHT 1.

Mixed martial arts record

References 

1994 births
Living people
Jordanian male mixed martial artists
Mixed martial artists utilizing boxing
Mixed martial artists utilizing jujutsu
Olympic boxers of Jordan

Jordanian male boxers
Ultimate Fighting Championship male fighters
Featherweight mixed martial artists
Featherweight boxers
Lightweight mixed martial artists
Lightweight boxers